Deh Shir (also Romanized as Deh Shīr and Deh-i-Shīr; also known as Dekh-Shir and Deshīr) is a village in Howmeh Rural District, in the Central District of Khodabandeh County, Zanjan Province, Iran. At the 2006 census, its population was 618, in 130 families.

References 

Populated places in Khodabandeh County